Hypocoena stigmatica  is a species of moth of the family Noctuidae. It is found on the Faroe Islands and Iceland, as well as parts of Russia and Alaska.

The length of the fore wings is about 13 mm.

The larvae probably feed on Ammophila and Leymus species.

Subspecies
Hypocoena stigmatica stigmatica (Southern Urals to Transbaikalia to Amur, Magadan, Alaska)
Hypocoena stigmatica dispersa (Faroe Islands, Iceland)

References

External links
Chortodes stigmatica (Eversmann, 1855) (Lepidoptera, Noctuidae) – a moth new to Surtsey, 1995
Image

Apameini
Insects of Iceland